Harold Jack Daniels (December 21, 1927 – April 16, 2013) was an American outfielder in Major League Baseball.
Listed at 5' 10", (1.78 m), 165 lb., (75 kg), Daniels batted and threw left-handed. He was born in Chester, Pennsylvania.

At age 24, it had been a long journey to the major leagues for Daniels. He spent nearly seven full seasons in the minor leagues, playing for nine teams at six different levels before reaching the majors with the  Boston Braves during the  season.

Daniels appeared in 106 games, mostly as a right fielder, while sharing outfield duties with Sid Gordon (LF) and Sam Jethroe (CF). He posted a batting average of .187 (41-for-219) with two home runs and 14 runs batted in, scoring 31 runs, and collecting five doubles, one triple and three stolen bases.

"Sour Mash Jack", as his teammates nicknamed him (a reference to Jack Daniel's whiskey), returned to the minors for six more seasons and retired at the end of 1958. He posted a .255 average with 167 homers and 214 RBI in 1375 games.

Daniels died in 2013 in Shreveport, Louisiana, at the age of 85.

See also
1952 Boston Braves season

Sources

Retrosheet

1927 births
2013 deaths
Major League Baseball right fielders
Boston Braves players
Bloomingdale Troopers players
Eau Claire Bears players
Evansville Braves players
Fort Lauderdale Braves players
Hartford Chiefs players
Havana Sugar Kings players
Raleigh Capitals players
Toledo Mud Hens players
Toronto Maple Leafs (International League) players
Baseball players from Pennsylvania
Sportspeople from Chester, Pennsylvania
American expatriate baseball players in Cuba